The Cochotte was a French automobile manufactured only in 1899.  An untidy-looking voiturette, it was powered by an exposed water-cooled engine which was mounted at the front of the vehicle.

References
David Burgess Wise, The New Illustrated Encyclopedia of Automobiles.

Defunct motor vehicle manufacturers of France